Team Mini-Max, LLC is a kit aircraft manufacturer located in Niles, Michigan. The company produces the Mini-MAX and Hi-MAX lines of aircraft. All the designs feature wooden construction with aircraft fabric covering.  The current models offered are powered by either Rotax or Hirth two-stroke or Volkswagen four-stroke engines.

History
The Mini-MAX family was originally produced by TEAM Incorporated (Tennessee Engineering and Manufacturing) of Bradyville, Tennessee.  The company was eventually bankrupted by a lawsuit and production passed to Ison Aircraft also of Bradyville, Tennessee and then to JDT Mini-MAX of Nappanee, Indiana. The Mini-MAX name stands for MINImum cost, MAXimum fun.

The company was renamed Team Mini-Max in 2012 and moved to Niles, Michigan.

Aircraft

References

External links

Aircraft manufacturers of the United States